"Let It Go" is a song by Hong Kong singer and actor Jacky Cheung (Cantonese pinyin: Hok Yau)（中文名：张学友）written by Roxanne Seeman, Daniel Lindstrom and Daniele Musto for Cheung's album Private Corner (2010). Cantonese lyrics were written by Kenny So (乔星 Qiao Xing). The song was released to radio by Universal Music in April 2010 as the fourth single and is the seventh track on the album.

Composition and recording
"Let It Go" was written over the internet by Daniel Lindstrom and Daniele Musto in Stockholm, Sweden and Roxanne Seeman in Santa Monica, California.  The lyrics for "Let It Go" were adapted into Cantonese by Hong Kong songwriter Kenny So with the chorus hook line "Let It Go" remaining in English.  The song is produced by Andrew Tuason.  The recording features a gospel choir arranged by and performed with Sylvia St. James, National Director of the House of Blues Gospel Brunch at the time of the recording.

Credits and personnel 
Credits are adapted from the album's liner notes.
 Jacky Cheung – lead vocals
 Miguel S. Inot – alto saxophone
 Andrew Tuason (杜自持) – arranger, horns, electric piano
 Sylvain Gagnon – bass
 Anthony M. Fernandes – drums
 Sylvia St. James - featuring, choir
  Danny Leung - Guitar
  Kenny So (乔星 Qiao Xing) – Cantonese lyrics
  Roxanne Seeman – songwriter
  Daniel Lindström – songwriter
  Daniele Musto – songwriter
  Charles Huntley - tenor saxophone
  Paul Panichi - trumpet

Hong Kong music charts
"Let It Go" was the fourth single reached number 16 on the HMVHK sales chart (most popular Hong Kong radio chart) April 2010. Cheung's Private Corner album remained at number 1 on the HMV HK sales chart for 13 weeks.

Live performances
Cheung performed "Let It Go" at his Private Corner Mini Concert at the Hong Kong Jockey Club on April 30.  The "Private Corner" Mini-Concert  DVD was released on July 23, 2010.

Cheung performed "Let It Go" on his Jacky Cheung 1/2 Century Tour in several cities including Kuala Lumpur, Malaysia.

References

Jacky Cheung songs
2010 songs
Songs written by Roxanne Seeman
Songs written by Daniel Lindström
Universal Music Group singles
Cantonese-language songs
Macaronic songs